Conrad Thibault (November 13, 1903 – August 1, 1987) was an American baritone vocalist who frequently appeared on radio, recordings, and concert tours.

Early years
Thibault was born and raised in Northampton, Massachusetts, where he was involved with the church choir.  Local resident Calvin Coolidge took notice of him and encouraged him to apply for a scholarship at the Curtis Institute of Music, from which he later graduated. He also graduated from the Juilliard School and was a student of Emilio de Gogorza, who became his mentor.

Career 
Thibault's professional career began in the late 1920s with the Philadelphia Grand Opera Company. His operatic debut came in 1928 in Puccini's Manon.

By the early 1930s, he was a regular performer on radio, appearing on such shows as His Master's Voice of the Air, The Maxwell House Showboat, The RCA Victor Show, Music in the Air, and as featured soloist with the orchestras of Ferde Grofé and Gustave Haenschen among others. In 1934-1935, he had the singing role of Jack Hamilton on The Gibson Family on NBC radio. In 1946-1947, he was a singer on The American Melody Hour radio program on the Blue Network. He also was heard regularly on The Chicago Theater of the Air, The Rochester Philharmonic Orchestra broadcasts, The Joe Cook Show, and The Packard Hour.

He made several 78 rpm recordings for the RCA Victor Red Seal label. He was also heard on numerous radio transcriptions produced and recorded by the World Broadcasting Company. Decca Records released several 78 rpm sides by Conrad Thibault in the 1940s.

In 1949 he became emcee for the ABC Television show The Jacques Fray Music Room, holding that position from August through October. In the 1950s he sang for the inauguration of President Dwight D. Eisenhower.

Thibault's repertoire was varied, including baroque arias, spirituals, Wagnerian opera, art songs, Broadway tunes, and patriotic songs.  He was known to be personable in concerts, and was expressive with his hands.

Later years 
In his later years, Thibault taught voice in New York at the Manhattan School of Music and in Florida at Palm Beach Atlantic College.

Personal life 
Thibault's first wife was Madeleine Gagne, whom he met when they both acted in an amateur production in Northampton, Massachusetts. They married when he was 20, and she died seven years later. He married Eleanor Kendall in 1935. The couple divorced in 1939. In 1942, he married Mary Clare West, a marriage which also ended in divorce in 1950. His fourth wife, Dee Thibault, died in 1986.

Death
In 1987, Thibault died at St. John's Hospital in Far Rockaway, Queens, New York at the age of 83. He was survived by a son, William.

Partial discography
Decca Records
 23346 - The House I Live In / I Spoke to Jefferson at Guadalcanal (1944)
 24126 - Suzanne, Suzanne, Pretty One / Ah, Suzette Dear (1946)
 24127 - Marianne's Loves / Pity Poor Mam'selle Zizi (1946)
 24128 - Come Dance, Codaine / When Your Potato's Done (1946)

Montgomery Ward Records
 6059 - You Alone / Shortnin' Bread (1933)

(RCA) Victor Records
 1583 - De Captaine Of De Marguerite / Sea Fever
 1626 - Less than Dust / The Temple Bells
 1636 - Kashmiri Song / 'Till I Wake
 1677 - Novembre / Plaisir d'Amour
 1679 - The Shepherdess / Passing By
 11829 - Where'er You Walk / Dedication; Our Native Land; Marie (1935)
 24404 - Last Roundup / Shortnin' Bread (1933)
 24423 - Love Is the Sweetest Thing / Day You Came Along (1933)
 24424 - It's Only a Paper Moon / This Is Romance (1933)
 24465 - Yesterdays / You Alone (1933)

References

Sources
 Billboard, vol. 56, no. 32, Aug 5, 1944 page 21.
 BroadwayWorld.com "Conrad Thibault". Retrieved June 10, 2010.
 Brooks, Tim and Marsh, Earle (2007). The Complete Directory to Prime Time Network and Cable TV Shows, 1946–Present.  Ballantine, New York.  .
 Curtis Institute of Music, Overtones, 1929, volume 2, page 44.
 Internet Movie Database, "Conrad Thibault". Retrieved June 10, 2010.
 Nauck, Kurt.  Catalogue: Vintage Record Auction Number 38.
 The New York Times, "Mrs. Thibault Gets Divorce From Singer", October 21, 1939, page 7.
 The New York Times, "Conrad Thibault Dies; An Ex-Radio Vocalist", August 4, 1987.
 Settlemier, Tyrone and Abrams, Steven. "The Online Discographical Project - Decca 23000 series". Retrieved June 10, 2010
 Settlemier, Tyrone and Abrams, Steven. "The Online Discographical Project - Decca 24000 series". Retrieved June 10, 2010
 Settlemier, Tyrone and Abrams, Steven. "The Online Discographical Project - Montgomery Ward 6000 series". Retrieved June 10, 2010
 Settlemier, Tyrone and Abrams, Steven. "The Online Discographical Project - Victor 24000 series". Retrieved June 10, 2010
 Upton, Charlotte, "Thibault Wins Huge Audience", The Spokesman-Review (Spokane, WA), April 1, 1955, page 5.

External links
List of Thibault's recordings provided by Discography Of American Historical Recordings, University of California, Santa Barbara, Library

1903 births
1987 deaths
People from Northampton, Massachusetts
American operatic baritones
Decca Records artists
RCA Victor artists
Curtis Institute of Music alumni
Juilliard School alumni
20th-century American male opera singers